Fenimorea phasma is a species of sea snail, a marine gastropod mollusk in the family Drilliidae.

Description
The length of this marine shell varies between 10 mm and 28 mm.

Distribution
This marine species occurs off Florida, USA and in the Northern Caribbean Sea.

References

 Schwengel, J. S. "New Mollusca from Florida." The Nautilus 54.2 (1940): 49–52.
  Tucker, J.K. 2004 Catalog of recent and fossil turrids (Mollusca: Gastropoda). Zootaxa 682:1–1295

External links
  Fallon P.J. (2016). Taxonomic review of tropical western Atlantic shallow water Drilliidae (Mollusca: Gastropoda: Conoidea) including descriptions of 100 new species. Zootaxa. 4090(1): 1–363
 

phasma
Gastropods described in 1940